Helešic (feminine Helešicová) is a surname of Czech origin. Notable people with the surname include:

Lukáš Helešic (born 1996), Czech rower
Matěj Helešic (born 1996), Czech footballer

Czech-language surnames